Bauza or accented Bauzá, Bauzà and Bauža is a surname. Notable people with the surname in its various forms include:

Antoine Bauza creator of 7 Wonders (board game)
David Bauzá (born 1976), Spanish retired footballer
Edgardo Bauza (born 1958), Argentine former footballer
Eduardo Bauzá (1939–2019), Argentine politician
Eric Bauza (born 1979), Canadian-American voice actor and comedian
Felipe Bauza (1764–1834), Spanish naval officer, hydrographer and cartographer
Francisco Bauzá (1849–1899), Uruguayan political figure and historian
Guillem Bauzà (born 1984), Spanish footballer
José Ramón Bauzà (born 1970), Spanish politician, president of the Autonomous Community of the Balearic Islands 2011–2015
Karolis Bauža (born 1987), Lithuanian judoka from city of Jurbarkas
Lorenzo Bauzá (1917–1971), Uruguayan chess master
Marcelo Bauza, retired Argentine football (soccer) player
Mario Bauzá (1911–1993), Afro-Cuban jazz musician
Raúl Bauza (born 1934), Argentine modern pentathlete
Rufino Bauzá (1791–1854), Uruguayan independence fighter and military and political figure
Sebastián Bauzá (born 1961), Uruguayan dentist, sports leader, politician and businessman
Walter Bauza (1939–2015), Argentine sport shooter

See also
Babuza (disambiguation)
Baza (disambiguation)
Buza (disambiguation)